Carlos Manuel Baldomir (born April 30, 1971) is an Argentine former professional boxer who competed from 1993 to 2014. He held the WBC, The Ring, and lineal welterweight titles in 2006, and challenged once for the WBC super welterweight title in 2007. On July 31, 2019 Carlos Baldomir was sentenced to 18 years in prison for molesting his 8 year old daughter over a period of 2 years.
In March 2020 false rumors spread that Baldomir had been killed in a prison riot after a picture was shared online of a deceased prisoner that bore a striking resemblance to the disgraced boxer.

Professional career

WBC, The Ring, and lineal welterweight champion 
Baldomir defeated Unified Welterweight Champion Zab Judah on January 7, 2006 in a mandatory challenge for Judah's title. The fight took place in Madison Square Garden, and with his pressure style and hard right hands Baldomir won a unanimous decision (115-113, 114-113 and 115-112). Baldomir was crowned World Champion, after 6 months of preparations in Los Angeles with Amílcar Brusa. After the fight, he said "This is a tribute to [Argentine boxing legend] Monzón" who had died eleven years earlier on January 8.

Baldomir failed to pay sanctioning fees imposed by the WBA & IBF when he beat Zab Judah for the WBC title, so, nominally at least, Judah remained the IBF title holder, while the WBA championship reverted to another boxer, Luis Collazo. (The SHOWTIME broadcast mentioned that Baldomir chose not to pay the sanctioning fees for the other organizations, out of loyalty to the WBC, which gave him the opportunity to fight for a world title by naming him the mandatory challenger to Judah.) He would have liked to pay all of the fees, but he would have lost money if he did (the fees were more than he was being paid for the fight). Despite this separation of the three title belts, Baldomir was universally regarded as the true Welterweight Champion since he defeated Judah, the recognized lineal champion.

Baldomir vs. Gatti 
On July 22, 2006 Baldomir successfully defended his WBC Welterweight title and won the IBA welterweight title by defeating fan favorite Arturo Gatti by TKO in the 9th round by overpowering the faster, but naturally smaller Gatti. This fight helped convince some skeptics that Baldomir's win over Judah was no fluke. Baldomir then expressed a desire to fight Floyd Mayweather Jr. to continue his unlikely rise in the welterweight division.

Baldomir vs. Mayweather Jr. 

Baldomir would eventually get his chance against the pound-for-pound king, Floyd Mayweather Jr., on November 4, 2006 in Las Vegas for the WBC, The Ring and lineal welterweight titles.  Said Baldomir of this challenge: "Mayweather is very good, but I can beat him. I'm going right at him. I'm going to keep attacking and not give him a chance to breathe or move. Mayweather has never fought anyone like me before."

Baldomir would ultimately lose both titles by unanimous decision.  Ringside punch statistics showed Mayweather landing 199 of 458 punches, while Baldomir landed just 79 of 670. Baldomir was paid $1.6 million, which was a career high in earnings.

During the fight, Baldomir chased Mayweather sluggishly, unable to land any meaningful shots but trying to remain the busier fighter, while Mayweather picked away with sharp jabs and hooks, even managing to cut Baldomir over his left eye in the first round.  This pattern continued throughout the fight, thanks in no small part to Baldomir's weighing in at 162 pounds compared to Floyd at 149 lbs, leading some to believe that Baldomir's sole intention was to knock Mayweather out.  The defensive-minded Mayweather, however, apparently not looking to knock out or even exchange blows with his opponent, put on what many witnesses called a "boxing clinic" to take Baldomir's WBC and lineal welterweight titles in a lopsided 12-round decision. Others, notably Larry Merchant, the famous HBO Analyst at ringside, said, during the fight.."Mayweather is the only major boxer I'ver ever seen, boring enough that his audience walks out on his during one of his fights",,and the camera then showed a long line of people walking to and out of the exits, including many celebrity figures. Two judges had Mayweather winning all 12 rounds, with the other giving all but two rounds to Mayweather.

Baldomir vs. Forrest 
Baldomir was challenged to fight by former champion, Shane Mosley, but HBO would not air the fight, so the concept was thrown aside. On July 28, on HBO's Boxing after Dark, he fought Vernon Forrest for the vacant WBC Light Middleweight championship, losing a lopsided, yet very exciting and competitive decision.  In the post fight interview with Larry Merchant, he indicated that he would likely retire from boxing.

Comeback 
On Friday, 23 November, Baldomir fought against rugged journeyman Luciano Perez at the Morongo Resort and Casino in Cabazon, California. Perez came on strong and rocked the former champion early, but Baldomir stayed calm, and began to re-establish himself in the fight, dominating the second half of the ten round bout and scoring a 10th-round TKO.

Professional boxing record

Pay-per-view bouts

See also
List of world welterweight boxing champions

References

External links

Carlos Baldomir profile at Cyber Boxing Zone

1971 births
Living people
Argentine male boxers
Sportspeople from Santa Fe, Argentina
Sportspeople convicted of crimes
People convicted of child sexual abuse
World Boxing Council champions
The Ring (magazine) champions
World welterweight boxing champions
Light-middleweight boxers
Middleweight boxers
Super-middleweight boxers